Rusko  is a village (former town) in the administrative district of Gmina Malczyce, within Środa Śląska County, Lower Silesian Voivodeship, in south-western Poland. Prior to 1945 it was in Germany.

References

Villages in Środa Śląska County
Former populated places in Lower Silesian Voivodeship